Mátraderecske is a village in Heves County, Northern Hungary Region, Hungary.

Sights

  The castle ruin of Kanázsvár
  The catholic church
  The thermal baths

See also
 List of populated places in Hungary

References

External links
 

Populated places in Heves County